Denys Babliuk (born 9 May 2001 in Khmelnytskyi Oblast, Ukraine) is a Ukrainian male sport shooter. He is the 2022 World Championships silver medalist.

Career
Babliuk's first international success came in 2018 when he became European junior champion in 10m running target. In 2020, he won two European Junior Championships medals: one gold and one bronze. He also competed at the 2018 World Championships in junior competitions but did not manage to win an individual medal.

Babliuk clinched his first senior medal at the 2022 World Championships in French Châteauroux where he finished second behind his teammate Ihor Kizyma in the 10 metre running target mixed competition.

References

External links
 Profile at the ISSF site

2001 births
Living people
Ukrainian male sport shooters
ISSF pistol shooters
21st-century Ukrainian people